Julio Salinas Fernández (born 11 September 1962) is a Spanish former footballer who played during the 1980s and 1990s.

A tall, lanky centre forward with skills, he was best remembered for his spell at Barcelona – having started his career with Athletic Bilbao – while he was also a prolific goalscorer for club and country.

Salinas earned 56 caps for Spain, and represented the nation in three World Cups and two European Championships.

Club career

Athletic and Atlético
Salinas was born in Bilbao, Biscay, joining Athletic Bilbao's youth academy at the age of 11. In 1983–84 he won the second division's Pichichi Trophy award, as he helped the reserves finish runners-up to Castilla CF. He also played 13 games for the first team over two seasons, scoring his first La Liga goal on 26 March 1983 in a 4–0 home win against RC Celta de Vigo as the Basques captured back-to-back league titles and added the 1984 Copa del Rey.

After two more seasons with Athletic, scoring a total of 12 goals for two-third-place finishes, Salinas moved to Atlético Madrid, where he found the net at an impressive rate (this included a brace on 7 February 1988 in a 7–0 home thrashing of RCD Mallorca).

Barcelona
Salinas signed for FC Barcelona for 1988–89, linking up with several other Basque players, including veteran José Ramón Alexanko, José Mari Bakero, Txiki Begiristain and Jon Andoni Goikoetxea – these would help form the backbone of the legendary Dream Team. He scored 20 league goals in his debut campaign as Barça finished second to Real Madrid, and he also netted in both the 1989 Cup Winners' Cup final against U.C. Sampdoria and in the following year's domestic cup 2–0 win over Real Madrid.

In the subsequent seasons, Salinas appeared sparingly for the club due to his age and the emergence of attacking players as Hristo Stoichkov, but would still manage to grab some important goals in spite of limited playing time. On 30 January 1994, after coming in as a second-half substitute against Albacete Balompié, he scored both goals in a 2–1 home victory, as he only played six games more during the season, with Barcelona eventually achieving four league titles in a row.

Late career
Upon leaving Catalonia, Salinas joined Deportivo de La Coruña, helping to a runner-up finish in his only season. Although not a regular in the starting lineups he finished with 12 league goals, only surpassed by club great Bebeto. As a late replacement at the Camp Nou on 3 December, he netted in a 1–1 draw after a header from José Luis Ribera.

After the signing of, among others, Russian Dmitry Radchenko, Salinas was deemed surplus to requirements, agreeing to a contract at Sporting de Gijón where he scored 18 times in the 1995–96 campaign, crucial in helping the Asturians avoid relegation. He was held in high regards in the city during his one-and-a-half-year spell, with the fans often singing: "Bota de oro, Salinas bota de oro!" ("Golden boot, Salinas, golden boot!").

Salinas then had a stint abroad with Yokohama Marinos in Japan, where he again showcased his scoring skills, teaming up with former Barcelona teammate Goikoetxea. He then returned close to home, having played his last two seasons with Deportivo Alavés where he notably scored in 1999–2000's opener, a 2–1 home defeat of Málaga CF; his team finished sixth, and would go on to reach the following year's UEFA Cup final.

On 19 May 2000, Salinas played his last professional match, scoring in a 2–1 loss at his first team Athletic Bilbao. He retired at nearly 38 with 417 matches and 152 goals, in the Spanish top flight alone.

International career
Salinas represented the Spain national team over a decade, scoring 22 goals. His debut was on 22 January 1986 as he netted in a 2–0 friendly win over the Soviet Union, in Las Palmas.

Salinas went on to represent the country at three FIFA World Cups: 1986 (where he scored against Northern Ireland), 1990 (netting in the second-round loss to Yugoslavia) and 1994, as well as two UEFA European Championships, 1988 and 1996.

In the 1994 World Cup quarter-final against Italy, after he had found the net in a 2–2 draw against South Korea, Salinas missed the chance to put Spain into the last-four stage. With 1–1 and less than ten minutes to go, he marred a fast-break, with only goalkeeper Gianluca Pagliuca to beat; Roberto Baggio sealed the 2–1 final result minutes later, and the Spaniard was ultimately more remembered for this miss rather than the massive number of goals scored during an 18-year professional career.

Post-retirement
Immediately after retiring, Salinas began working as a sports commentator, first for RTVE and then on laSexta.

Personal life
Salinas' younger brother, Francisco, was also a professional footballer (centre back), and played for Athletic Bilbao and Celta. Both made their top division debut in the 1982–83 season.

Career statistics

Club

International

Scores and results list Spain's goal tally first, score column indicates score after each Salinas goal.

Honours
Athletic Bilbao
La Liga: 1982–83, 1983–84
Copa del Rey: 1983–84
Supercopa de España: 1984

Barcelona
La Liga: 1990–91, 1991–92, 1992–93, 1993–94
Copa del Rey: 1989–90
Supercopa de España: 1991, 1992
European Cup: 1991–92
UEFA Cup Winners' Cup: 1988–89
European Super Cup: 1992

Deportivo
Copa del Rey: 1994–95

Individual
Pichichi Trophy: 1983–84 (Segunda División)

See also
 List of FC Barcelona players (100+ appearances)
 List of La Liga players (400+ appearances)

References

External links

1962 births
Living people
Spanish footballers
Footballers from Bilbao
Association football forwards
La Liga players
Segunda División players
Segunda División B players
Bilbao Athletic footballers
Athletic Bilbao footballers
Atlético Madrid footballers
FC Barcelona players
Deportivo de La Coruña players
Sporting de Gijón players
Deportivo Alavés players
J1 League players
Yokohama F. Marinos players
Spain under-21 international footballers
Spain international footballers
1986 FIFA World Cup players
UEFA Euro 1988 players
1990 FIFA World Cup players
1994 FIFA World Cup players
UEFA Euro 1996 players
Basque Country international footballers
Spanish expatriate footballers
Expatriate footballers in Japan
Spanish expatriate sportspeople in Japan
Spanish beach soccer players
Spanish television presenters